Chawpi Hanka (Quechua chawpi central, middle, hanka snowcapped ridge or peak; ice, "central ridge (or peak)", hispanicized spelling Chaupijanca) is a mountain in the Andes of Peru, about  high. It is situated in the Ancash Region, Bolognesi Province, in the districts of Huallanca and Huasta, and in the Huánuco Region Lauricocha Province, Queropalca District. It lies on a ridge north of the Waywash mountain range.

References 

Mountains of Peru
Mountains of Ancash Region
Mountains of Huánuco Region